Michael A. Wettlaufer is a United States Navy rear admiral who has commanded the Military Sealift Command since June 28, 2019. He was previously the Commander of Carrier Strike Group 3 from August 2017 to June 2019.

References

External links
 

Year of birth missing (living people)
Living people
Place of birth missing (living people)
United States Navy admirals